Dukhovets is a rural locality in Mokovsky Selsoviet Rural Settlement, Kursky District, Kursk Oblast, Russia. Population:

Geography 
The village is located on the Seym River (a left tributary of the Desna), 81 km from the Russia–Ukraine border, 9 km south-west of Kursk, 4 km from the selsoviet center – 1st Mokva.

 Streets
There are the following streets in the locality: Andreyevskaya, Aprelskaya, Beryozovaya, Chaynaya, Dobraya, Dorozhnaya, Druzey, Dukhovetskaya, Georgiyevskaya, Ilyinskaya, Izumrudnaya, Kofeynaya, Krasivaya, Lenskaya, Letnyaya, Maly pereulok, Mariinskaya, Naberezhnaya, Nadezhdy, Nikolskaya, Ozernaya, Pobedy, Polevaya, Polyanskaya, Prostorny pereulok, Roz, Semeynaya, Skazochnaya, Sportivnaya, Tomskaya, Tsvetochnaya, Tsvetochny pereulok, Uspeshnaya, Yaroslavskaya and Yuzhnaya (748 houses).

 Climate
Dukhovets has a warm-summer humid continental climate (Dfb in the Köppen climate classification).

Transport 
Dukhovets is located 2 km from the federal route  Crimea Highway (a part of the European route ), on the road of intermunicipal significance  (M2 "Crimea Highway" – Dukhovets), 6 km from the nearest railway station Dyakonovo (railway line Lgov I — Kursk).

The rural locality is situated 19 km from Kursk Vostochny Airport, 121 km from Belgorod International Airport and 221 km from Voronezh Peter the Great Airport.

References

Notes

Sources

Rural localities in Kursky District, Kursk Oblast